Ali Ahmed Mullah (born 5 July 1945), is the veteran muazzin (caller for prayer) at the Masjid al-Haram in Mecca, Saudi Arabia for the past three decades. Ali Ahmed Mulla is the longest serving muazzin for the Masjid al-Haram and has been following his family tradition in this profession since 1975.

He is widely respected across the Muslim world and recordings of his Adhan are widely bought and enjoyed by Muslims and non-Muslims around the world through a wide variety of media. He also has stated that his main job other than a muezzin at the holy mosque is working in his self-owned business. He married 4 times had 3 children with each wife. His son, Atef bin Ali Ahmed Mulla, is now carrying on his legacy and he made his debut in Masjid-al-Haraam on 4 April 2022.

Career

Ali Ahmed Mullah began performing adhan at the mosque when he was 14, calling for prayer from the minarets in the absence of Abdul Hafeez Khoja, his maternal uncle, Abdul Rahman Mullah, his paternal uncle, and Ahmed Mullah, his grandfather, who were all muezzins at the mosque. Mullah began performing before the introduction of loudspeakers, when muezzins stood at each of the seven minarets such as the Bab Al-Umrah Minaret, Bab Al-Ziyara Minaret, and Bab Al-Hekma Minaret and called for prayer. The timing to deliver the adhan was given by the chief of muezzins from Al-Shafie Maqam, near the Zamzam Well and each muezzin repeated what the first muezzin said until the adhan was completed. It was a tradition started by the Ottomans, which is continued today in Turkey. After graduating from the Institute of Technical Education in Riyadh in 1970, Mulla worked as a teacher at Abdullah ibn Al-Zubair Intermediate School. He was officially appointed muezzin at the Masjid al-Haram in 1984. He has also had the honor to perform adhan at the Al-Masjid al-Nabawi in Medinah on one occasion. Performing adhan at the Masjid al-Haram, for Muslims the holiest mosque in the world, has been claimed by him as a very great honor.

See also
Adhan
Masjid al-Haram
Al-Masjid al-Nabawi
Mu'azzin
Mecca
Imam

References

External links
The Legendary Azan of Sheikh Ali Ahmed Mulla familiar around the Islamic world
The Sheikh doing the Azan live in Masjid Al Haram, Mecca
October 2003 interview
Ali Ahmed Mulla azan collection from Makkah
Ali Ahmed Mulla

Mu'azzins
1945 births
Living people